Mikkel Kirkeskov Andersen (born 5 September 1991) is a Danish professional footballer who plays as a left back for  club Holstein Kiel.

Career

AGF
Kirkeskov was born in Aarhus, Denmark, and started playing football for VRI before joining the youth ranks of the city's main team, AGF in 2005. He was promoted to their first team in the spring of 2009. He made his league debut for AGF in the second tier of Danish football in a 3–0 away victory against FC Fredericia on 7 November 2010, replacing Adam Eckersley at half-time. After the winter break, Kirkeskov made more appearances and the club reached promotion back to the Danish Superliga towards the end of the season. He made his debut in the top tier on 15 August 2011 in a 1–1 away draw against Silkeborg IF, coming off the bench in the 80th minute for Stephan Petersen. In his first season in the Superliga, Kirkeskov made 16 games.

Aalesund
Kirkeskov moved to Tippeligaen side Aalesunds FK in January 2016.

Piast Gliwice
On 15 February 2018, Kirkeskov joined Polish Ekstraklasa club Piast Gliwice.

Holstein Kiel
In December 2020 it was announced Kirkeskov would move to 2. Bundesliga club Holstein Kiel for the second half of the 2020–21 season on a contract until summer 2023.

Career statistics

Club

References

External links
 
 

Living people
1991 births
Footballers from Aarhus
Danish men's footballers
Association football fullbacks
Denmark under-21 international footballers
Denmark youth international footballers
Aarhus Gymnastikforening players
Odense Boldklub players
Aalesunds FK players
Piast Gliwice players
Holstein Kiel players
Danish Superliga players
Eliteserien players
Ekstraklasa players
2. Bundesliga players
Danish expatriate men's footballers
Expatriate footballers in Norway
Danish expatriate sportspeople in Norway
Expatriate footballers in Poland
Danish expatriate sportspeople in Poland
Expatriate footballers in Germany
Danish expatriate sportspeople in Germany